Statistics of Primera División Uruguaya for the 1999 season.

Overview
It was contested by 15 teams, and Peñarol won the championship.

Apertura

Clausura

Overall

Playoff
Peñarol 1–1 ; 1–1 ; 2–1 Nacional
Peñarol won the championship.

References
Uruguay – List of final tables (RSSSF)

Uruguayan Primera División seasons
Uru
1999 in Uruguayan football